Eduardo Antonio "Tony" Laing Cárcamo (born 27 December 1958) is a retired Honduran football player and member of the Honduras national football team, known for his game-tying goal against Northern Ireland in the 1982 FIFA World Cup.

Club career
Nicknamed Aguja (the Needle), Laing started playing professional football in Honduras at age 17, and is the fourth all-time leading scorer for Platense with 45 goals.  He also played for Marathón, as well as in Greece with Ethnikos before retiring as a player in 1997.

International career
In 1982, Laing was selected for the Honduras World Cup team as a reserve.  He entered as a substitute in the 58th minute of Honduras's second game, against Northern Ireland, and scored the game-tying goal in the 60th minute with a header from a corner kick. He represented his country in 7 FIFA World Cup qualification matches and also appeared in the 1985 CONCACAF Championship, scoring two goals for Honduras in qualifying play. In total, Laing earned a total of 34 caps, scoring 8 goals.

Retirement
In 2007, Laing moved to New Orleans, Louisiana, where he coaches amateur soccer and works as a painting contractor.

Personal life
He is married to Nidia Zaldivar and the couple have three children.,  Bessy Lizeth, 
Edward Anthony and Anthony Jeerod. Also has 5 grandchildren: Frances Sabrinah, 
Francheska Antonellah, Edwin Elijah, 
Aubrey Paulette and Jaylah Camille.

References 

1958 births
Living people
People from Puerto Cortés
Association football forwards
Honduran footballers
Honduras international footballers
1982 FIFA World Cup players
Platense F.C. players
Ethnikos Piraeus F.C. players
C.D. Marathón players
Honduran expatriate footballers
Expatriate footballers in Greece
Honduran expatriate sportspeople in Greece
Liga Nacional de Fútbol Profesional de Honduras players
CONCACAF Championship-winning players